Hyde Lake is located by Cooper Corners, New York. Fish species present in the lake are largemouth bass, smallmouth bass, rock bass, northern pike, walleye, yellow perch, yellow bullhead, bluegill, and black crappie. There is a state owned beach launch off NY-26 north of Theresa, New York.

References 

Lakes of Jefferson County, New York